Danilo Alexandro Gómez (born 12 February 2002) is an Argentine professional footballer who plays as a midfielder for Colón.

Club career
Gómez joined Colón at the age of eight. He was moved into Eduardo Domínguez's first-team midway through 2020, initially training with them during pre-season. He was on the bench twice before making his bow, as he went unused for a Copa de la Liga Profesional match with San Lorenzo on 19 December and for a Copa Argentina encounter with Cipolletti on 14 January 2021. Gómez's senior debut arrived just under a month later, with the midfielder appearing for the final moments of a Copa de la Liga win away to Central Córdoba on 12 February; he replaced Luis Rodríguez off the bench.

International career
In July 2017, Gómez received a call-up to train with the Argentina U15s. February 2018 saw a call-up to the U16s.

Career statistics
.

Notes

References

External links

2002 births
Living people
People from Las Colonias Department
Argentine footballers
Argentina youth international footballers
Association football midfielders
Argentine Primera División players
Club Atlético Colón footballers
Sportspeople from Santa Fe Province